Now the People! is a political movement in the European Union. It was founded in April 2018 by a declaration from Catarina Martins from the Portuguese party Bloco de Esquerda, Pablo Iglesias from the Spanish party Podemos, and Jean-Luc Mélenchon, leader of La France Insoumise main French socialist party.

After discussions about the austerity policy of the Greek government under Alexis Tsipras and his Syriza party, the leaders of the leftist La France insoumise departed the Party of the European Left, joined by Iglesias and Podemos as well as Martins and Bloco. In June 2018, the Danish Red–Green Alliance, Finnish Left Alliance and the Swedish Left Party co-operated with the French Maintenant le Peuple ! (MLP). The Portuguese, Finnish and Danish parties are members of both Now the People and Party of the European Left.

Potere al Popolo, a coalition of several small left-wing parties and organisations in Italy, also "lent its support" to MLP, calling it "a very important call proposed by three of the most popular alternatives from Europe [Left Bloc, Podemos and La France Insoumise], which we cannot ignore." However, as Potere al Popolo did not participate in the 2019 European Parliament election, and as it had no incumbent MEPs in the eighth European Parliament, it is not a full member of MLP.

In the European elections, parties associated with MLP won a total of 14 seats. La France Insoumise won six seats, the most out of MLP's constituent parties.

In the ninth European Parliament, MLP joined with other left-wing parties and independents, including the Party of the European Left from which MLP split, in the European United Left–Nordic Green Left group.

Members
There are currently six members of MLP, not including Potere al Popolo (PaP). Except PaP, all are represented in the European Parliament for the ninth term, with three parties (the Red–Green Alliance, the Left Alliance and the Left Party) sending one member to Parliament and another three (Podemos, La France Insoumise and the Left Bloc) sending multiple members. The Unidas Podemos list, which Podemos leads, elected six members to the European Parliament, but only three are members of Podemos and only three sit within MLP in the European Parliament. Two members of Unidas Podemos' list — Manu Pineda and Sira Rego — are members of the United Left (IU) and the third — Ernest Urtasun — is a member of Green Left, which itself is a constituent party of the regional alliance Catalunya en Comú (CatComú). None of IU, Green Left or CatComú are members of MLP. Furthermore, Urtasun does not sit with European United Left–Nordic Green Left as IU and Podemos do; he sits within the European Greens–European Free Alliance group.

Notes

References

External links

Declaration Maintenant le peuple! Pour une révolution citoyenne en Europe

2018 establishments in Europe
Democratic socialist parties in Europe
Pan-European political parties
Party of the European Left
Political parties established in 2018
Socialist parties in Europe
Jean-Luc Mélenchon